Nawila (also Ngéré Néwet, Nawila, Île Nowéla, Île Nivoula, Île Niwula Pulo) is a small uninhabited island in Torba Province of Vanuatu in the Pacific Ocean.

Name

Geography
Nawila lies 500 m east of Kwakéa in the Banks Islands archipelago. The island is part of a three-island group on an atoll 3.2 km long and 1.9 km wide. There is a small vegetated islet 150 m south of Nawila.

References

Islands of Vanuatu
Sanma Province
Uninhabited islands of Vanuatu